Tesseracephalus is a genus of parasitic flies in the family Tachinidae. There is one described species in Tesseracephalus, T. lenis.

Distribution
Mexico

References

Dexiinae
Diptera of North America
Monotypic Brachycera genera
Tachinidae genera